The Liepāja Party is a localist political party in Latvia. It operates in the city of Liepāja, where its chairman, Uldis Sesks, was mayor from 1997 to 2018. The party has an agreement with the Union of Greens and Farmers allowing party members to be elected in the Saeima, including current members Māris Kučinskis (former Prime Minister of Latvia), Valdis Skujiņš and Aija Barča.

Election results

Legislative elections

References

External links
Official website 

Political parties in Latvia
2004 establishments in Latvia
Political parties established in 2004
Centrist parties in Latvia